Gerald Ellis "Dusty" Hannahs III (born September 2, 1993) is an American professional basketball player for the Santa Cruz Warriors of the NBA G League. He played college basketball for Texas Tech and Arkansas.

Early life and high school
Hannahs was born and raised in Little Rock, Arkansas and attended high school at Pulaski Academy. He was a three-time All-District selection and was named first team 4A All-State in his junior and senior seasons with the Bruins. He committed to Texas Tech University after his junior season after averaging 26.2 points per game and shooting 51 percent from three. In his senior season, Hannahs averaged 20 points per game and led PA to the 4A state championship game and scored 43 points in a loss to Clarksville High School.

College career

Texas Tech
Hannahs began his collegiate career at Texas Tech. He averaged  6.9 points as a freshman and 7.7 points per game as a sophomore while appearing mostly as a three-point specialist and sixth man off the bench. He set the Texas Tech season record for free throw percentage with 92.3 in his sophomore season. Following the end of the season, Hannahs announced that he would be transferring to the University of Arkansas.

Arkansas
Hannahs played for the Arkansas Razorbacks for the final two seasons of his eligibility after sitting out one year due to NCAA transfer rules. In his first season with the team, Hannahs led the Razorbacks with 16.5 points per game and lead the Southeastern Conference (SEC) with 81 three pointers made and a .433 three point percentage. He was named to the Jerry West Award watchlist going into his redshirt senior season. Hannahs again led Arkansas in scoring in his final season with 14.4 points per game and led the SEC with a 90.8 free throw percentage (10th-best in the nation) and was named second team All-SEC by NBCSports.com. He scored 1,047 points for the Razorbacks, becoming the fifth Arkansas player to score 1,000 points in two seasons, and finished ninth in school history with 155 three pointers made and with the third-best free throw percentage at .889.

Professional career

Memphis Hustle (2017–2019)
Hannahs originally committed to play overseas for AZS Koszalin of the Polish Basketball League but ultimately opted to sign with the Memphis Hustle of the NBA G League on October 6, 2017. In his first professional season, Hannahs appeared mostly as the Hustle's sixth man and averaged 9.2 points per game while shooting 44.1 percent on three point shots and  90.5 percent from the free throw line. He returned to the Hustle for a second season and was the only player on from the previous year's team on the roster. He averaged 14.5 points, 1.8 rebounds and 1.4 assists in 49 games, again as the Hustle's primary option off the bench, and led the G League with a 92.6 free throw percentage. Following the end of the season, Hannahs participated in the 2019 G-League Elite Camp along with other top G League players and college prospects.

Memphis Grizzlies (2019)
On March 30, 2019, the Memphis Grizzlies signed Hannahs to a 10-day contract. Hannahs made his NBA debut on March 31, 2019 in a 113–96 loss to the Los Angeles Clippers, scoring four points on 2-of-7 shooting with four assists and one rebound in 13 minutes of play. He was waived by the Grizzlies on April 4, 2019 after appearing in two games, scoring eight total points with a rebound and five assists. Following the end of the NBA season, Hannahs was named to the Grizzlies roster for the 2019 NBA Summer League.

Hannahs was named to the NBA G League Elite Team for the G League International Challenge in Montevideo, Uruguay. He averaged 14 points per game in the tournament, including a 21-point performance off the bench in the quarterfinals against the Urugayan League Elite team, as the G League Elite eventually fell in the final to Bayern Munich of the EuroLeague.

Hannahs was re-signed by the Grizzlies on October 14, 2019, but was waived the next day.

Return to the Hustle (2019–2020)
On October 27, 2019, Hannahs returned to the Hustle for a third season. Hannahs was named the G League Player of the Week on December 2, 2019 after scoring 28 points against the Oklahoma City Blue and 32 points against the Maine Red Claws. Hannahs was named Midseason All-NBA G League for the Western Conference. Hannahs averaged a team-leading 21.4 points per game on the season and was named third team All-NBA G League.

Return to the Grizzlies (2020)
Hannahs was signed to a second 10-day contract on February 21, 2020. Hannahs was later waived by the Memphis Grizzlies on February 27, 2020.

Kolossos Rodou (2020)
On November 27, 2020, Hannahs signed with Kolossos Rodou of the Greek Basket League. On December 22, 2020, Hannahs parted ways with the Greek club citing family matters overseas.

Santa Cruz Warriors (2021)
On January 11, 2021, the Memphis Hustle announced that they had acquired the returning rights to David Stockton from the South Bay Lakers in exchange for the returning rights to Hannahs'. His returning rights was later traded to the Santa Cruz Warriors for a 2022 first round pick. The next day, Hannahs was included in the roster of the Warriors.

Adelaide 36ers (2021–2022)
On July 20, 2021, Hannahs signed with the Adelaide 36ers for the 2021–22 NBL season.

Return to Santa Cruz (2022–present)
On October 24, 2022, Hannahs rejoined the Santa Cruz Warriors roster for training camp.

Personal life
Hannahs is the son of former Arkansas and MLB pitcher Gerry Hannahs. Hannahs' father nicknamed him "Dusty" after former Los Angeles Dodgers teammate Dusty Baker.

Career statistics

NBA

Regular season

|-
| style="text-align:left;"| 
| style="text-align:left;"| Memphis
| 2|| 0 || 13.0 || .250 || .000 || 1.000 || .5 || 2.5 || .5 || .0 || 4.0
|-
| style="text-align:left;"| 
| style="text-align:left;"| Memphis
| 2 || 0 || 6.5 || .444 || .667 || 1.000 || .5 || .0 || .0 || .0 || 6.0
|- class="sortbottom"
| style="text-align:center;" colspan="2"| Career
| 4 || 0 || 9.8 || .333 || .250 || 1.000 || .5 || 1.3 || .3 || .0 || 5.0

College

|-
| style="text-align:left;"|2012–13
| style="text-align:left;"|Texas Tech
| 31 || 17 || 22.4|| .393 || .374 || .806 || 1.1 || .4|| .5 || 0.0 || 6.9
|-

| style="text-align:left;"|2013–14
| style="text-align:left;"|Texas Tech
| 32 || 10 || 22.1 || .378 || .369 || .923 || 1.3 || 1.4|| .4|| 0.0 || 7.7
|-
|-
| style="text-align:left;"|2014–15
| style="text-align:left;"|Arkansas
| style="text-align:center;" colspan="11"|Did not play – transfer
|-
| style="text-align:left;"|2015–16
| style="text-align:left;"|Arkansas
| 32 || 20 || 27.1 || .458|| .433 || .870 || 2.4 || .9 || .6 || 0.0 || 16.5
|-
| style="text-align:left;"|2016–17
| style="text-align:left;"|Arkansas
| 37 || 23 || 24.7 || .439 || .387|| .908 || 1.7 || 1.2 || .4 || .1 || 14.4
|-
| style="text-align:center;" colspan="2"|Career
| 131 || 70 || 24.1|| .428 || .395 || .888 || 1.7 || .9 || .5 || 0.0 || 11.5

References

External links
Texas Tech Red Raiders bio
Arkansas Razorbacks bio
NBA G League profile
RealGM profile

1993 births
Living people
Adelaide 36ers players
American expatriate basketball people in Australia
American expatriate basketball people in Greece
American men's basketball players
Arkansas Razorbacks men's basketball players
Basketball players from Arkansas
Kolossos Rodou B.C. players
Memphis Grizzlies players
Memphis Hustle players
Santa Cruz Warriors players
Shooting guards
Sportspeople from Little Rock, Arkansas
Texas Tech Red Raiders basketball players
Undrafted National Basketball Association players
United States men's national basketball team players